Nathan Adler (1911–1994) was an American psychoanalyst, a lecturer in Criminology and Psychology at the University of California, Berkeley, and professor of clinical psychology at the California School of Professional Psychology at Berkeley/Alameda. Between 1965 and 1970 he conducted extensive clinical studies of drug users in the San Francisco Bay area. He authored the book The Underground Stream: New Lifestyles and the Antinomian Personality. In his youth, he wrote for several prominent leftist journals in New York.

Early life 

Nathan Adler was born in New York City, the second of five children. His siblings were Martha, Irving, Bob, and Ray. His parents emigrated to the United States from a part of Austria that is now in Poland. His father Marcus arrived in 1906 and his mother Celia (née Kress) arrived four years later along with his elder sister, Martha. After moving to San Francisco, he worked for the Jewish Personal Service Committee, providing counseling for inmates at San Quentin and Alcatraz prisons. He began his studies in psychology in San Francisco under the mentorship of Siegfried Bernfeld and served on the board of the Mental Hygiene Society of Northern California. In 1943 he married Elizabeth Haverstock Adler (1912 - 2006), a public health educator who taught at the UC Berkeley School of Public Health.

References 

1911 births
1994 deaths
American psychoanalysts
Jewish psychoanalysts
University of California, Berkeley College of Letters and Science faculty